"You'll Never Stop Me Loving You" is the debut single of English pop singer Sonia. Written and produced by Stock Aitken Waterman, the song was included on Sonia's debut album, Everybody Knows (1990). The single became Sonia's only number-one single on the UK Singles Chart and reached number 10 on the US Billboard Dance Club Play chart.

Background and release
In a 1990 interview, Sonia told about how she met the producer, "The whole thing is quite like a dream to me. Pete [Waterman, of Stock Aitken Waterman] was doing this radio road show in Liverpool, and I thought to myself, 'Oh this is a chance I can't miss!' So I went along to try and sing to him." Gaining Waterman's attention was not easy, but once she did, the producer added her to PWL's Coca-Cola Hitman Roadshow, a tour of England featuring the label's up-and-coming artists. In the United Kingdom, PWL and Chrysalis Records released the song on 12 June 1989 as a 7-inch and 12-inch vinyl single. Three weeks later, on 3 July, a cassette single was issued.

Chart performance
"You'll Never Stop Me Loving You" debuted on the UK Singles Chart at number 55 on 24 June 1989. It peaked at number one three weeks later, becoming Sonia's only number-one single there. The single stayed on the chart for 13 weeks. In Ireland, the song peaked at number one and charted for eight weeks. It also peaked within the top 10 in Greece and Norway, and was a top-20 hit in Belgium, Spain, and West Germany.

In Australia, the single entered the ARIA Singles Chart at number 160 in August 1989, reaching a peak of number 29 in October 1989 and charting for 17 weeks. In the United States, "You'll Never Stop Me Loving You" peaked at number 10 on the Billboard Dance Club Play chart in April 1990. It also peaked at number 26 on the Billboard 12-inch Singles Sales chart the same month.

Critical reception
Bill Coleman from Billboard wrote, "Successful European track will entice American jocks hankering for bubbly pop/NRG with "French Kiss" twist. Already showing early signs of widespread radio crossover." Pan-European magazine Music & Media found that "the SAW backing sounds like most of the other work they have done but at least Sonia has a good voice." Richard Lowe from Smash Hits felt the single "was probably the best all year."

Impact and legacy
British magazine Classic Pop ranked "You'll Never Stop Me Loving You" number 27 on their list of the "Top 40 Stock Aitken Waterman songs" in 2021. They wrote, "18-year-old Sonia Evans was a complete unknown when she approached Pete Waterman for a break in the biz, and luckily SAW, er, saw potential in the effervescent, ginger-haired scouser. Despite slightly stalkerish lyrics – 'When I know that you're alone, I wander to your home and catch a glimpse or two' – it rocketed up the charts. Some thought it was Kylie, which might have helped its rise to the top of the UK hit parade. It was SAW's final No.1... mind you, that year they racked up seven."

Track listings

 7-inch, 12-inch, and cassette single
 "You'll Never Stop Me Loving You"
 "You'll Never Stop Me Loving You" (instrumental)

 UK 12-inch remix single
A. "You'll Never Stop Me Loving You" (Sonia's Kiss mix)
B. "You'll Never Stop Me Loving You"

 US cassette single
A. "You'll Never Stop Me Loving You" (7-inch version) – 3:22
B. "You'll Never Stop Me Loving You" (Kissing mix) – 6:40

 Japanese mini-CD single
 "You'll Never Stop Me Loving You"
 "You'll Never Stop Me Loving You" (extended version)
 "You'll Never Stop Me Loving You" (instrumental)

Credits and personnel
Credits are taken from the UK 7-inch single liner notes.

Studio
 Recorded at PWL Recording Studios 1 and 4 (London, England)

Personnel

 Stock Aitken Waterman – writing, production, arrangement
 Mike Stock – backing vocals, keyboards
 Matt Aitken – guitars, keyboards
 Sonia – lead vocals
 Suzanne Rhatigan – backing vocals
 Linda Taylor – backing vocals
 Ian Curnow – additional keyboards
 A Linn – drums
 Mixmaster Pete Hammond – mixing
 Karen Hewitt – engineering
 Yoyo – engineering
 Simon Fowler – photography

Charts

Weekly charts

Year-end charts

Cover versions

 The song was covered as a hi-NRG/eurodance song by singer Belle Lawrence for the compilation album, Almighty Presents Handbag Heaven: Let This Feeling.
 In 1991, Hong Kong singer Stephanie Lai covered the song in Cantonese.
 In 2004, Italian artists Nuage covered the song on their album Sunday, which was only released in Japan.
 Denise Van Outen performed the song in her one women show "Some Girl I Used to Know".
 In 2006, Australian pop group Young Divas covered the song on their self-titled debut album.

References

1989 debut singles
1989 songs
Chrysalis Records singles
European Hot 100 Singles number-one singles
Irish Singles Chart number-one singles
Pete Waterman Entertainment singles
Song recordings produced by Stock Aitken Waterman
Songs written by Matt Aitken
Songs written by Mike Stock (musician)
Songs written by Pete Waterman
Sonia (singer) songs
UK Singles Chart number-one singles